Bryan Alonso González Olivan (born 10 April 2003) is a Mexican professional footballer who plays as a winger for Liga MX club Pachuca.

International career

Youth
González was part of the under-17 squad that participated at the 2019 CONCACAF U-17 Championship, scoring two goals, where Mexico won the competition. He also participated at the 2019 U-17 World Cup, where Mexico finished runner-up.

González was called up to the under-20 team by Luis Ernesto Pérez to participate at the 2021 Revelations Cup, appearing in three matches, where Mexico won the competition. In June 2022, he was named into the final 20-man roster for the CONCACAF Under-20 Championship, in which Mexico failed to qualify for the FIFA U-20 World Cup and Olympics.

Career statistics

Club

Honours
Pachuca
Liga MX: Apertura 2022

Mexico U17
CONCACAF U-17 Championship: 2019
FIFA U-17 World Cup runner-up: 2019

Mexico U20
Revelations Cup: 2021

References

External links
 

2003 births
Living people
Mexico youth international footballers
Association football forwards
Liga MX players
C.F. Pachuca players
Footballers from Chihuahua
Sportspeople from Ciudad Juárez
Mexico under-20 international footballers
Mexican footballers